Nová Dedinka is a village and municipality in western Slovakia in  Senec District in the Bratislava Region.

History
In historical records the village was first mentioned in 1252.

Geography
The municipality lies at an altitude of 130 metres and covers an area of 10.242 km2. It has a population of 1751 people.

References

External links/Sources

 Official page
http://www.statistics.sk/mosmis/eng/run.html

Villages and municipalities in Senec District